"Nadie Como Ella" (English: "[There Is] Nobody Like Her") is a song written by Omar Alfanno and performed by American singer Marc Anthony on his studio album Todo a Su Tiempo (1995) and was released as the third single from the album. A music video for the song was released in 1995 and features Puerto Rican actress Roselyn Sánchez. Cashbox critic Héctor Reséndez remarked on the video that "the actor-singer offers his best video performance as being
completely enamored with a beautiful woman". A live version of the song was included on Anthony's compilation album Éxitos Eternos (2003).

Charts

See also
List of Billboard Tropical Airplay number ones of 1994 and 1995
List of Billboard Tropical Airplay number ones of 1996

References

1995 songs
1995 singles
Marc Anthony songs
Songs written by Omar Alfanno
Song recordings produced by Sergio George
RMM Records singles
Spanish-language songs